North Red Iron Lake is a natural lake in Marshall County, South Dakota, in the United States.

The Red Iron Lakes have the name of a Native American chieftain.

See also
List of lakes in South Dakota
South Red Iron Lake

References

Lakes of South Dakota
Lakes of Marshall County, South Dakota